Vallin or Vallín is a surname. Notable people with the surname include:

 Ari Vallin (born 1978), Finnish ice hockey player
 Charles Vallin (1903–1948), French politician
 Émile Vallin (1833–1924), French military physician
 Eugène Vallin (1856–1922), French furniture designer and manufacturer
 Jean-Baptiste Michel Vallin de la Mothe (1729–1800), French architect 
 Louis Vallin (1770–1854), French general
 Ninon Vallin (1886–1961), French soprano
 Rick Vallin (1919–1977), Russian American actor
 Sergio Vallin
 Veikko Vallin (born 1962), Finnish politician